Pauline Mary Philip, DBE, has been the Chief Executive of Luton and Dunstable University Hospital NHS Foundation Trust since 2010. She has previously worked for the World Health Organization. She was made an Honorary Dame Commander of the Order of the British Empire (DBE) in the 2017 Special Honours.

Philip was appointed the national urgent and emergency care lead by NHS England in 2016. In 2016 the Health Service Journal named her as the fifth most influential Chief Executive in the English National Health Service.

She provides national leadership to ensure the delivery of the urgent and emergency care review and associated elements of the Five Year Forward View.

References

British chief executives
Honorary Dames Commander of the Order of the British Empire
Living people
Place of birth missing (living people)
Year of birth missing (living people)